Michael Benner may refer to:
Michael Paul Benner (1935–1957), British recipient of the George Cross
Maikel Benner (born 1980), Dutch baseball player